Tarzan, the Ape Man is a 1981 American adventure film directed by John Derek and starring Bo Derek, Miles O'Keeffe, Richard Harris, and John Phillip Law. The screenplay by Tom Rowe and Gary Goddard is loosely based on the 1912 novel Tarzan of the Apes by Edgar Rice Burroughs, but from the point of view of Jane Parker.

The original music score is composed by Perry Botkin Jr. Former Tarzan actor Jock Mahoney (billed as Jack O'Mahoney) was the film's stunt coordinator. The film is marketed with the tagline Unlike any other "Tarzan" you've ever seen! The original actor cast in the Tarzan role was fired (or quit) early in production, resulting in the sudden casting of his stunt double, Miles O'Keeffe, in the title role. The film was panned by critics,  and in some circles has been considered to be one of the worst films ever made. Despite this, it was a box-office success, grossing $36.5 against a $6.5 million budget.

Plot

James Parker is a hunter in Africa, searching for a mythical "white ape". He is joined by his estranged daughter, Jane, after her mother's death. They discover the "white ape" is actually Tarzan, an uncivilized white man raised by apes living in the jungle. James continues to pursue Tarzan with the purpose of capturing him, dead or alive, and bringing him back to England.

Realizing that James is on his trail, Tarzan kidnaps Jane. Jane and Tarzan become fascinated by each other. Jane is then kidnapped by natives who intend to make her the wife of the tribe leader, forcing Tarzan into action. James is killed by the Ivory King, the huge brutish ruler of the tribe, and the natives remove Jane's clothes and tie her up. They wash her naked body in plain view, laughing at her shocked, humiliated protests, and then smear her with paint. Tarzan arrives and kills the Ivory King in single combat by breaking his neck, then performs the Tarzan yell before rescuing Jane. The final scene shows Tarzan and Jane making love and interacting with the animals peacefully.

Cast
 Bo Derek as Jane Parker, James' daughter and Tarzan's lover
 Richard Harris as James Parker, Jane's father
 John Phillip Law as Harry Holt
 Miles O'Keeffe as Tarzan, Jane's lover
 Steven Strong as Ivory King, the tribe leader
 Maxime Philoe as Riano
 Leonard Bailey as Feathers
 C.J. the Orangutan as Orangutan

Production
Bo Derek was extremely popular at the time due to her appearance in 10. After making A Change of Seasons, she was meant to appear in High Road to China but pulled out of the film saying she wanted to be directed only by her husband John.

In February 1980, Metro-Goldwyn-Mayer announced the studio was making a Tarzan film with the Dereks. Warner Bros. complained, as that studio was also developing a Tarzan film with Robert Towne called Greystoke and they had the rights to the character from the Burroughs estate. MGM argued the Derek film would be the second remake of their 1932 film Tarzan the Ape Man which they had the right to do, having released the first remake in 1959. The Burroughs estate sued MGM.

Development
In a 2012 interview with the film history magazine Filmfax, co-writer Gary Goddard revealed that he had originally been commissioned to write a screenplay for Bo Derek based upon the Marvel Comics superheroine, Dazzler; a 30-page treatment was completed before the project was canceled and work instead proceeded on Tarzan, The Ape Man which initially carried the working title Me, Jane reflecting its focus on Jane Porter as a showcase for Derek.

Goddard, who became better known for his work in theme parks, said he wrote the script in two weeks.

Shooting
Filming took place in Sri Lanka in February 1981.

The original Tarzan was Lee Canahalin. He injured his knee in 1980 meaning he was reliant on his stuntman. His stuntman had to undergo an emergency appendectomy when filming started. This resulted in Canahalin being replaced by Miles O'Keeffe.

Richard Harris enjoyed working with the Dereks; Bo had played a supporting role in his movie Orca, four years prior to Tarzan.

Reception
The film was widely panned upon its release. Film critic and historian Leonard Maltin considers this one of the worst films ever to appear in his popular TV movies and Video Guide (now simply Movie Guide): "Deranged 'remake' lacks action, humor and charm; Forget about comparisons to Johnny Weissmuller; O'Keefe makes Elmo Lincoln seem like Edwin Booth."  Leslie Halliwell described Tarzan, the Ape Man as  "certainly the worst of the Tarzan movies and possibly the most banal film so far made; even the animals give poor performances". In a discussion of Tarzan films, Thomas S. Hischak was also negative: "Produced and directed without a shred of talent by John Derek, Tarzan, the Ape Man often ranks high in the lists of the worst movies ever made."

However, critic Roger Ebert offered a somewhat more positive review of Tarzan, the Ape Man, awarding it two and a half stars out of a possible four. According to Ebert, the film was "completely ridiculous, but at the same time it has a certain disarming charm." Ebert thought Harris's talents were completely wasted and the film's dramatic peak was "incomprehensible", yet he praised the forthright depiction of the sexual passion and tension between Tarzan and Jane, which had more typically been downplayed in film adaptations of the characters: "The Tarzan-Jane scenes strike a blow for noble savages, for innocent lust, for animal magnetism, and, indeed, for soft-core porn, which is ever so much sexier than the hard-core variety."

Reviewing the movie retrospectively for The Encyclopedia of Fantasy, John Grant comments that the movie "is widely regarded as the direst of the Tarzan movies, but it has enough good bits (including some spectacular photography and moments of exquisite wrongness) that, if cut by about 40 minutes, it would be highly regarded. As it is, it leaves a nasty taste: its intention seems to be to appeal to those who find eroticism in the sexual humiliation of women." On Rotten Tomatoes, the film has an aggregate score of 10% based on 2 positive and 18 negative critic reviews.

Box office
Despite the negative reviews it received, the film was a success at the box office. It opened in 950 theatres in the United States, except New York, and was the highest-grossing film of the weekend with a gross of $6,700,809. It went on to gross US$36,565,280 in the United States and Canada.

Awards and nominations

DVD
Tarzan, the Ape Man was released to DVD by Warner Home Video on June 8, 2004, as a Region 1 widescreen DVD.

In popular media
The Japanese manga series JoJo's Bizarre Adventure references this movie in chapter 265, the final chapter of the manga's third part, Stardust Crusaders. Jōtarō Kūjō tests his grandfather Joseph Joestar with trivia questions, including "Who's the female lead in the 1981 film, Tarzan, the Ape Man?", which Joseph correctly answers with "Bo Derek". This scene is also featured in the last episode of the second season of the manga's 2012 anime adaptation.

Follow up
Gary Goddard said he was going to write more films for the Dereks including one called Pirate Annie. However, financing for Annie was withdrawn when the studio, CBS, read the script and were unhappy with what they considered too small a role for Bo Derek.

See also
 List of films considered the worst

References

External links
 
 
 
 
 
 

 

1981 films
1980s fantasy adventure films
American fantasy adventure films
American satirical films
1980s English-language films
Films directed by John Derek
Films scored by Perry Botkin Jr.
Films set in the 1910s
Films set in 1910
Films set in Africa
Films shot in Seychelles
Films shot in Sri Lanka
Metro-Goldwyn-Mayer films
American sexploitation films
Tarzan films
Golden Raspberry Award winning films
1980s American films